New Colors is an album by jazz musician Freddie Hubbard recorded in 2000 and released on the Hip Bop Essence label in 2001.

Track listing
 "One of Another Kind" - 8:00  
 "Blue Spirits" - 9:03  
 "Blues for Miles" - 6:31  
 "Dizzy's Connotations" - 8:43  
 "True Colors" - 5:06  
 "Red Clay" - 8:19  
 "Osie Mae" - 6:09  
 "Inner Space" (Corea) - 7:45  
All compositions by Freddie Hubbard except as indicated

Personnel
Freddie Hubbard - flugelhorn
David Weiss - trumpet
Craig Handy - tenor and soprano saxophone
Myron Walden - alto saxophone
Ted Nash - alto saxophone
Luis Bonilla - trombone
Chris Karlic - baritone saxophone 
Xavier Davis - piano
Dwayne Burno - bass
Joe Chambers - drums
Idris Muhammad - drums
Steve Davis - trombone
Kenny Garrett - alto saxophone
Javon Jackson - tenor saxophone

References

2001 albums
Freddie Hubbard albums